The 2018 Central Java gubernatorial election was held on 27 June 2018 as part of the simultaneous local elections. It was conducted to elect the governor of Central Java along with their deputy, whilst members of the provincial council (Dewan Perwakilan Rakyat Daerah) will be re-elected in 2019.

Incumbent governor Ganjar Pranowo ran for his second term in office against former Minister of Energy and Mineral Resources Sudirman Said. Despite polling lower than expected by most surveys, Ganjar managed to defeat Said to secure his second term as governor.

Timeline
On September 10, the General Elections Commission declared a voter count of 27,409,316 in the province. Voting will be done in 64,171 polling stations across the province.

Registration for party-backed candidates were opened between 8 and 10 January 2018, while independent candidates were required to register between 22 and 26 November 2017. The campaigning period would commence between 15 February and 24 June, with a three-day election silence before voting on 27 June.

Candidates
Under regulations, candidates are required to secure the support of a political party or a coalition thereof comprising at least 20 seats in the regional house. Alternatively, independent candidates may run provided they are capable of securing support from 6.5 percent of the total voter population (1,781,606) in form of photocopied ID cards subject to verification by the local committee although no candidates expressing interest managed to do this.

Incumbent Ganjar Pranowo, who had run with PDI-P in the 2013 elections, once again did so and the party declared him as the candidate on 7 January 2018. His deputy and old running mate Heru Sudjatmoko (id) also expressed an intention to run and the pair collected KPU's registration form together. However, on the candidate declaration Megawati Soekarnoputri declared Taj Yasin Maimoen from PPP, son of senior politician and ulema Maimun Zubair (id). According to 67-year old Heru, he had accepted the party's decision and plans to retire soon. PPP, which had earlier submitted possible running mates for Ganjar, officially backed the pair on 9 January. Nasdem and Demokrat submitted their support on the same day, while Golkar did so on 10 January.

The coalition of Gerindra, PKS and PAN declared Sudirman Said, Minister of Energy and Mineral Resources between 2014-2016, as their gubernatorial candidate on 27 December 2017. A non-official faction of PPP, headed by Djan Faridz, also expressed its support for Said. PKB, which initially supported Ganjar, threw its weight behind Said and placed their cadre Ida Fauziyah as his running mate. Ida is a member of the People's Representative Council, where she serves as speaker of her party's faction.

Opinion polls

After formal nominations

Before nominations

Results

Quick count

Real Count

Gallery

See also
Politics of Indonesia

References

2018 Indonesian gubernatorial elections
Elections in Central Java